FIRST Power Up, stylised as ''FIRST'' POWER UP, is the FIRST Robotics Competition game for the 2018 season. It involves two alliances of three teams each, with each team controlling a robot and performing specific tasks on a field to score points. The game has a retro 8-bit theme and teams are required to place milk crates, or "power cubes", on large balancing scales to tip the scale and gain ownership. Alliances can also trade power cubes for power ups, giving them a temporary advantage in a match. At the end of the match, robots can climb the tower attached to the centre balancing scale using a rung attached to the tower, giving them additional points.

Kickoff 
The kickoff event occurred on Saturday January 6, 2018. The kickoff video featured an 8-bit style animation, outlining FIRST's mission, and an explanation of the game. The event was livestreamed from 10:30am ET, with many teams attending their own local kickoff event to watch the livestream.

Field 
FIRST Power Up is played on a 27 ft (823 cm) by 54 ft (1646 cm) field that is covered in grey carpet, called the "Arcade". The field is bounded by transparent polycarbonate guardrails on the longer sides and the Alliance Station walls on the shorter side. While most of the field is alliance-neutral, including where the scoring areas are located, there are some alliance-specific zones, which are the Null Territory, Platform Zone, Power Cube Zone and Exchange Zone on the field, and the Alliance Station and Portals outside the field. All zones belong to the alliance whose Alliance Station is closest to the zone, with the exception of Null Territory and the Portals.

Power Cube Zone 
The Power Cube Zone is an alliance-specific area in front of the Switch that contains 10 power cubes for the alliance that owns the Power Cube Zone to use. Robots of the opposing alliance may not cause Power Cubes that are inside the Power Cube Zone to be removed from the Power Cube Zone. The Power Cube Zone includes the tape used to define the area, but not the Switch that it is adjacent to. The Auto Line runs parallel to the Alliance Station wall, crossing through the centre of the Power Cube Zone, and touching both Guardrails.

Platform Zone 
The Platform Zone is an alliance-specific area between the Switch and Scale that protects robots from opposition interference and gives additional freedoms when attempting end game objectives such as climbing. It includes the tape, Switch and Tower walls used to define the area as well as the rung connected to the Tower. It also contains 6 power cubes that are available for both alliances to use.

Null Territory 
Null Territory is an alliance-specific area next to the alliance's Plate on the Scale that protects robots from opposition interference when attempting to place power cubes on the scale. It includes the tape used to define the area but not the Guardrails.

Exchange Zone 
The Exchange Zone is an alliance-specific area next to the Alliance Station wall that stops opposing robots blocking access to where the alliance's robots can give power cubes to their Human Players through the Exchange. It includes the tape used to define the area but not the Alliance Station wall.

Portals 
Each alliance owns two Portals at the two corners opposite to its Alliance Station. This is where Human Players can give robots additional power cubes through the walls and each contains 7 power cubes. It includes the tape and the wall used to define the area.

Alliance Station 
Each alliance owns an Alliance Station that is at one of the ends of the field. The Alliance Station is where Drivers control their robots at the Driver Stations, Human Players manage power cubes and Coaches give advice to their team members. Technicians, who provide technical assistance and assist with moving the robot, must stay outside of the Alliance Station and the Portals at all times. At the beginning of the match, during the Autonomous Period, all alliance members must stay behind the Starting Line in the Alliance Stations.

Exchange 
The Exchange is a place in the Alliance Station wall where robots can give power cubes to their Alliance Station for either storage in the Alliance Station, storage in the Vault or return to the field. The Exchange Zone surrounds the Exchange, making it a protected area.

Vault 
The Vault is a device at the back of the Alliance Station that Human Players interact with to obtain power ups. Human Players place power cubes, which are collected from the field through the Exchange, inside the Vault to earn Power Ups, with the strength of each Power Up related to how many power cubes are inside the Vault when the power up is played.

Scoring Areas 
There are two Switches, one owned by each alliance, and a Scale, which is neutral, located on the field. An alliance's Switch is located 14 ft (427 cm) in front of the Alliance Station wall and its Plates are 9in (23 cm) above the carpet when level. The Scale is located in the centre of the field and its plates are 5 ft (152 cm) above the carpet when the match begins. The two rungs connected to the Scale's Tower are 7 ft (213 cm) above the carpet, extend 8.25in (21 cm) out from the Tower and are 1 ft 1in (33 cm) across. There are two Plates on each end of the Scales and Switches, one belonging to each alliance. At the beginning of the match, the Plates that each alliance owns are randomised.

Ownership 
Switches and Scales begin the match level, with no alliance having ownership. An alliance gains ownership of a Switch or Scale if, by placing power cubes on their Plate, the respective Switch or Scale is tipped by the weight of the power cubes. An alliance also gains ownership of their Switch if the Force Power Up is played at level 1 or 3, and gains ownership of the Scale if the Force Power Up is played at level 2 or 3.

Gameplay and Scoring

Scoring Elements 
There is only one scoring element in this game, power cubes. Power cubes are 1 ft 1in (33 cm) wide, 1 ft 1in deep and 11in (27 cm) tall milk crates covered in a yellow nylon cover. The FIRST logo covers the open face of the milk crate.

Autonomous Period 
Robots start the match contacting their Alliance Station wall, with no part of the robot inside the Exchange Zone, with up to 1 power cube preloaded onto the robot. The first 15 seconds of the match is the Autonomous Period, where robots act solely on pre-programmed instructions, hence acting autonomously. Drivers and Human Players must stay behind the Starting Line throughout this period. Robots can earn points in a variety of ways. If any part of a robot's bumpers completely cross the Auto Line, they gain 5 points for their alliance. However, they may not pass Null Territory to stop opposing robots completing their Autonomous tasks. If an alliance gains ownership of the Scale or their own Switch, they gain 2 points. For every whole second that an alliance owns the Scale or their Switch in Autonomous, they gain an additional 2 points.

Teleop Period 
After the Autonomous Period ends, the Teleop (Tele-operated) Period begins, which lasts for 135 seconds. Drivers control their robot from their Driver Station and Human Players deliver power cubes through the Portals and place power cubes in the Vault. If an alliance gains ownership of their Switch in Teleop, they gain 1 point, or 2 points if the Boost Power Up is active at level 1 or 3. For every whole second that an alliance owns their Switch in Teleop, they gain an additional 1 point, or 2 points if the Boost Power Up is active at level 1 or 3. If an alliance gains ownership of the Scale in Teleop, they gain 1 point, or 2 points if the Boost Power Up is active at level 2 or 3. For every whole second that an alliance owns the Scale in Teleop, they gain an additional 1 point, or 2 points if the Boost Power Up is active at level 2 or 3. For every power cube an alliance places in their Vault, they gain 5 points.

Power Ups 
During the Teleop Period, teams have access to three Power Ups: Levitate, Force, and Boost. These Power Ups are activated through placing power cubes that are obtained through the Exchange in the Vault. No two Power Ups can be active simultaneously with the exception of Levitate, which both alliances can activate at any point during the Teleop Period. After a Power Up has been activated by an alliance, it cannot be used again. Except for Levitate, all Power Ups last for 10 seconds, and if another Power Up is activated in this time (except for Levitate) it is placed in a queue. The number of power cubes required and effects of the Power Ups are detailed in the table below.

End Game 
The last 30 seconds of the Teleop Period is called the End Game. During this time, robots can earn additional points by performing tasks in their Platform Zone. If a robot is fully supported by the Scale, fully outside the opponent's Platform Zone and has its bumpers at least 1 foot above the Platform when time runs out, the robot earns a Climb and 30 points. If a robot has met all of the criteria above but does not have its bumpers at least 1 foot above the Platform when time runs out, the robot earns a Park and 5 points. If the Levitate Power Up has been activated and no more than 2 robots have Climbed, a Climb is credited to a random robot who has not Parked or Climbed. If all robots have at least Parked, one random robot who has not Climbed will be credited with a Climb.

Special Scoring 
In addition to these methods of scoring, alliances can perform special tasks to gain additional points. If an alliance can get all 3 of their robots to complete an Auto-Run and have ownership of their Switch at the end of the Autonomous Period, they have completed the Auto Quest and gain 1 extra Ranking Point in qualification matches. If an alliance has all 3 of their robots credited with a Climb (whether through an actual Climb or the Levitate Power Up), they can Face the Boss and gain 1 extra Ranking Point in qualification matches. If an alliance breaks a rule, they may be penalized. A Foul will result 5 points being credited to the opposing alliance, and a Tech Foul will result in 25 points being credited to the opposing alliance.

Scoring Summary

Events 

The FIRST Power Up competition season is divided into seven weeks, with many events occurring simultaneously during each week. After Week 7, teams that have qualified compete in the FIRST Championship, held over two weeks in Houston and Detroit. Only regional and district championship events are shown.

Week 1

Week 2

Week 3

Week 4

Week 5

Week 6

Week 7

FIRST Championship

Results 
The following tables show the winners of the subdivisions and finals at each FIRST Championship event.

Houston

Subdivision Winners

Einstein

Round Robin 
<onlyinclude>

Finals

Detroit

Subdivision Winners

Einstein

Round Robin 
<onlyinclude>

Finals

References 

FIRST Robotics Competition games
2018 in robotics